Beverly Hills is a village in Oakland County of the U.S. state of Michigan. As of the 2010 census, the population was 10,267. Located within Southfield Township, Beverly Hills is by far the most populated village in the state.

History
The area was incorporated as a village named Westwood in 1958.  It was incorporated in the same year as the much larger city of Southfield to the south.  By incorporating as a village, it prevented the area from being annexed into the city and allowed the village to retains its own autonomy.  In 1959, the village changed its name to Beverly Hills.

Geography

Demographics

2010 census
As of the census of 2010, there were 10,267 people, 4,038 households, and 2,888 families living in the village. The racial makeup of the village was 89.2% White, 6.6% African American, 0.2% Native American, 2.0% Asian, 0.4% from other races, and 1.6% from two or more races. Hispanic or Latino of any race were 1.7% of the population.

There were 4,038 households, of which 34.0% had children under the age of 18 living with them, 60.5% were married couples living together, 8.4% had a female householder with no husband present, 2.6% had a male householder with no wife present, and 28.5% were non-families. 24.7% of all households were made up of individuals, and 11% had someone living alone who was 65 years of age or older. The average household size was 2.52 and the average family size was 3.04.

The median age in the village was 44.7 years. 25.1% of residents were under the age of 18; 5% were between the ages of 18 and 24; 20.5% were from 25 to 44; 32.1% were from 45 to 64; and 17.4% were 65 years of age or older. The gender makeup of the village was 47.8% male and 52.2% female.

2000 census
As of the census of 2000, there were 10,437 people, 4,085 households, and 2,998 families living in the village. The racial makeup of the village was 93.21% White, 3.05% African American, 0.15% Native American, 1.85% Asian, 0.02% Pacific Islander, 0.29% from other races, and 1.44% from two or more races. Hispanic or Latino of any race were 1.41% of the population.

There were 4,085 households, out of which 33.0% had children under the age of 18 living with them, 64.8% were married couples living together, 6.3% had a female householder with no husband present, and 26.6% were non-families. 23.6% of all households were made up of individuals, and 10.8% had someone living alone who was 65 years of age or older.  The average household size was 2.52 and the average family size was 3.01.

In the village, the population was spread out, with 24.6% under the age of 18, 4.0% from 18 to 24, 26.2% from 25 to 44, 26.1% from 45 to 64, and 19.1% who were 65 years of age or older.  The median age was 42 years. For every 100 females, there were 91.4 males.  For every 100 females age 18 and over, there were 87.5 males.

The median income for a household in the village was $90,341, and the median income for a family was $102,223. Males had a median income of $80,283 versus $49,265 for females. The per capita income for the village was $43,452.  About 1.7% of families and 2.3% of the population were below the poverty line, including 1.5% of those under age 18 and 2.1% of those age 65 or over.

Education
Beverly Hills is a part of the Birmingham Public School District. It is home to several public schools: Groves High School, Berkshire Middle School, Beverly Elementary, and Greenfield Elementary.

The upper school and administrative offices of the Detroit Country Day School, a private prep school, are in Beverly Hills. The school's middle school campus is also in Beverly Hills.

The French School of Detroit holds its middle school classes at Berkshire Middle School, and high school classes at Groves High School. Beverly Elementary School provides classes for FSD elementary school students.

Kensington Academy, a Catholic PK-8 school, previously had its campus in Beverly Hills. In 2006 the school announced that it was merging into the Academy of the Sacred Heart.

Recreation
Beverly Hills Athletic Club - summer swim and tennis club
Beverly Hills Club - indoor tennis and fitness club
Woodside Athletic Club - summer swim and tennis club

Notable people 

Jordan Gruber (born 1983), American-Israeli soccer player
 Mike Posner, singer and songwriter who attended Groves High School
 Charles Erwin Wilson (born 1890), U.S. Medal of Freedom Recipient, 5th U.S. Secretary of Defense, and President/CEO of General Motors interred at Acacia Park Cemetery (a Masonic cemetery)

References

External links

Village of Beverly Hills official site

Villages in Oakland County, Michigan
Villages in Michigan
Metro Detroit
1958 establishments in Michigan
Populated places established in 1958